Vanja Vučićević (born 22 March 1998) is a Serbian footballer who plays as a forward. He is a son of Serbian former professional footballer Nebojša Vučićević.

Club career

Early years
Born in Belgrade, Vučičević was with Dorćol and OFK Beograd youth selections, before he a scholarship contract FK Čukarički. As the best Serbian youth league scorer, Vučićević was licensed for the 2015–16 Serbian SuperLiga season, but after he refused to sign a professional contract with club, he missed to play any official appearances with the first team.

Red Star Belgrade
In summer 2016, Vučićević signed his first four-year professional contract with Red Star Belgrade, but due to administrative problems he failed to play with new club until November same year. He passed the winter break-off season with senior squad, but later also played with reserves and youth team. He made his professional debut in 36 fixture of the 2016–17 Serbian SuperLiga season under coach Boško Gjurovski, replacing Srđan Plavšić in 71 minute of the match against Javor Ivanjica, played on 17 May 2017. Vučićević also started his first senior match on the field in last fixture match of the season, against Radnički Niš.

In August 2017, Vučićević moved on one-year loan deal to Borac Čačak. Vučićević suffered a metatarsal bone fracture during the training on 18 September 2017, after which he left out of the team until the end of a year. After the end of the first half-season in the domestic competition, a loan deal was mutually terminated and Vučićević returned to Red Star Belgrade. Next he moved to Spartak Subotica on deal for the rest of season, which was officially confirmed on 8 February 2018. While with Spartak, Vučićević made an appearance against Red Star on 5 May 2018, joining the game as a back-up for Ognjen Đuričin. Returning to Red Star Belgrade, Vučićević passed the first training with the club on 11 June 2018. Later, he was excluded for the summer pre-season after which it was announced he would leave Red Star. He mutually terminated the contract and officially left the club on 19 June 2018.

Krylia Sovetov Samara
On 25 August 2018, he signed a one-year contract with the Russian Premier League side PFC Krylia Sovetov Samara. He only made 3 league appearances for the senior squad, mostly playing for the Under-21 team.

Sinđelić Beograd
On 29 July 2019, he signed with the Serbian club FK Sinđelić Beograd.

International career
Vučićević was a part of Serbia national under-17 football team until 2015. As a coach of Serbia national under-18 football team, Ivan Tomić called Vučićević into the squad in summer 2015. He played several matches until the end of same year, scoring goals in matches against Poland and Germany. He was also called into the Serbia U19 level in 2017.

Style of play
In his early years, Vučićević mostly played as left winger. In a period while his father, Nebojša, trained him as a coach in OFK Beograd youth academy, he started using Vanja as a centre forward. After he converted his position on the field, Vučićević scored around 20 goals on average in each of the next several seasons in youth categories. Playing with youth team of FK Čukarički, Vučićević was the best scorer in the first half of the 2015–16 season in Serbian youth league with 16 goals, playing as a centre forward. Moving to Red Star Belgrade, Vučićević was usually used as a second striker in his first caps with the club.

Career statistics

Club

References

External links
 
 
 
 

1998 births
Footballers from Belgrade
Living people
Serbian footballers
Serbia youth international footballers
Association football forwards
FK Čukarički players
Red Star Belgrade footballers
FK Borac Čačak players
FK Spartak Subotica players
PFC Krylia Sovetov Samara players
FK Sinđelić Beograd players
FK Inđija players
FK Zvezdara players
FK Teleoptik players
FK Makedonija Gjorče Petrov players
Serbian SuperLiga players
Russian Premier League players
Serbian First League players
Macedonian First Football League players
Serbian expatriate footballers
Expatriate footballers in Russia
Serbian expatriate sportspeople in Russia
Expatriate footballers in North Macedonia
Serbian expatriate sportspeople in North Macedonia